Saman Ghoddos (born 6 September 1993) is a professional footballer who plays as an attacking midfielder, striker or winger for  club Brentford and the Iran national team.

Born in Sweden to Iranian parents, he initially played for the Sweden national team, before switching allegiance to Iran in 2017.

Club career

Östersund

2016 season
Saman Ghoddos scored 10 league goals in his first season in the Allsvenskan for Östersunds FK, including their first top-flight goal in his Allsvenskan debut on 4 April 2016 against Hammarby IF. He scored a brace at his hometown club Malmö FF on 22 October in Swedbank Stadion. After his good performances in the 2016 season, Ghoddos drew interest from German club Hertha Berlin and Dutch club Ajax.

2017 season
Ghoddos started the 2017 season in fine form, leading Östersund to the Swedish Cup final with six goals in six games, including an acrobatic goal in the quarter-final against Trelleborgs FF and a brace in the semi-final against Häcken. He scored his seventh domestic cup goal of the season in the final, leading Östersund to the second qualifying round of the 2017–18 UEFA Europa League with manager Graham Potter.

In his UEFA debut, Ghoddos scored a goal and provided an assist for a 2–0 win against Galatasaray on 13 July 2017. In the return leg, Ghoddos won a penalty with a dribble past Fernando Muslera. In a league match on 13 August, he scored a long-range goal from 40 meters out against Hammarby IF in Stockholm's Tele2 Arena. On 24 August, Ghoddos scored two goals in the Europa League play-offs against PAOK to qualify his team to the group stages of the competition. He scored the club's first tournament proper goal in their group stage debut on 14 September. He won the attacker of the year award at the end of the 2017 Allsvenskan season. On 23 November, Ghoddos scored the winning goal to send his club to the knockout phase of the Europa League.

2018 season

Ghoddos provided two assists in his side's 2–1 win in the second leg of the Europa League round of 32 against English Premier League side Arsenal in London, though they were defeated 4–2 on aggregate. He scored his first league goal of the season on 15 April against IFK Göteborg, and scored a free kick on 30 April against Brommapojkarna. On 14 May, he scored from a free kick against AIK in the Friends Arena. He scored another goal in the next game during a derby match against GIF Sundsvall. Upon returning from the World Cup, Ghoddos captained his club side and scored a goal in a 2–1 win at Hammarby. He scored another free kick in the following match on 14 July at Malmö FF. Ghoddos scored a brace in the following match against Trelleborg to become joint-top scorer of the 2018 Allsvenskan. He subsequently won the Allsvenskan player of the month award for his performances in July.

Amiens
On 23 August 2018, Ghoddos transferred to French Ligue 1 side Amiens SC signing a five-year contract. The transfer fee paid to Östersund was reported as 40 million SEK (about €3.8 million) plus bonuses which would make the transfer the third-most expensive in Allsvenskan history after Alexander Isak and Zlatan Ibrahimović. However, the transfer was put in doubt by La Liga newcomers SD Huesca contacting FIFA to enquire about the validity of their own agreement to sign Ghoddos. Ghoddos had signed a contract with the Spanish club which also had a written agreement with Östersund. Previously, Stade Rennais had decided against signing Ghoddos.

Ghoddos made his competitive debut for Amiens on 25 August 2018 in the Ligue 1 4–1 home win over Reims, scoring a goal for Amiens in the 58th minute. He thus became the first Iranian player to play in Ligue 1.

On 29 August 2019, FIFA suspended Ghoddos from all games for four months plus a €4 million fine for his failed transfer to Huesca. On 10 November 2020, the Court of Arbitration for Sport partially upheld the ruling with the fine being removed but Östersund being banned from signing new players for the next two transfer windows.

Loan to Brentford
On 21 September 2020, Ghoddos joined English Championship side Brentford on a one-year loan deal with a subsequent option for a two-year permanent deal. He made his club debut on 1 October 2020 with an assist to Marcus Forss in an EFL Cup match against Fulham. He scored his first goal for the club and provided an assist on 9 January 2021 in an FA Cup match against Middlesbrough.

Brentford
On 14 January 2021, Ghoddos completed a permanent move to Brentford, with a contract that runs until the summer of 2023 with the option for an extra year. He scored his first league goal for the club on 20 January 2021 against Luton Town. In May 2021, Ghoddos and Brentford clinched promotion to the Premier League, the first top-flight appearance for the club in 74 years. He made his Premier League debut on 21 August 2021 against Crystal Palace at Selhurst Park. Ghoddos scored his first goal in the Premier League on 30 October 2021 against Burnley.

International career

Sweden
Due to his Iranian heritage, Ghoddos was eligible to be called up by both Iran and Sweden. In December 2016, Ghoddos was called up by Sweden manager Janne Andersson for friendlies against Ivory Coast and Slovakia. He made his debut against the Ivory Coast on 8 January 2017 and scored his first international goal for Sweden in a 6–0 win over Slovakia on 12 January 2017.

Iran
In June 2017, Ghoddos revealed that he had been approached by the Iranian federation. In an interview in July 2017, Ghoddos stated that he may accept an invitation to play for Carlos Queiroz's Iran should he be given one. He applied for Iranian citizenship on 21 August, stating that it is an honour to play for Sweden and his decision to represent either country is "fifty-fifty". He was not called into Sweden's World Cup qualification squad on 23 August, with Janne Andersson opting to choose expatriate footballers and stating that Ghoddos is not far from a call-up if he were to remain with the Swedish national team.

On 25 August 2017, Ghoddos revealed in an interview that he acquired his Iranian passport from the embassy. The following day, 26 August 2017, he announced on his Instagram page that he would be joining Iran for their 2018 World Cup qualifiers against South Korea and Syria. Ghoddos was called up for the first time for the Iran senior team training camps on 27 August 2017 by coach Carlos Queiroz for Iran's 2018 FIFA World Cup qualifying matches against South Korea and Syria. After Ghoddos couldn't make his debut for Iran due to administrative issues with FIFA, he was called into Sweden's World Cup qualification squad on 27 September for matches against Luxembourg and Netherlands. However, on 29 September, the Swedish Football Association released a statement on their website stating Ghoddos had declined the offer, choosing to play for Iran instead. He made his debut for Iran in a 2–0 friendly victory against Togo on 5 October 2017. On 9 November, he scored his first goal for Iran in a friendly match against Panama.

On 13 May 2018, Ghoddos was named in Queiroz's preliminary squad for the 2018 FIFA World Cup. In an interview with Olof Lundh in May 2018, Ghoddos stated that if the Swedish federation had contacted him earlier, it's very likely for him to have chosen to represent Sweden, though he does not regret his decision to play for Iran. Club teammate Emil Krafth later added that Ghoddos told him he wanted to play for Sweden. He was named in Iran's final 23-man squad for the 2018 World Cup on 4 June 2018. Ghoddos made his World Cup debut against Morocco on 15 June 2018, winning a free kick that led to a goal for Iran’s first World Cup win in twenty years. He was used as a substitute in all three World Cup matches against Morocco, Spain and Portugal. After the World Cup in November 2018, Ghoddos faced conscription issues in Iran.

He was named in Queiroz’s final squad for the 2019 AFC Asian Cup on 26 December 2018. In the team's opening match of the tournament, Ghoddos came on as a second-half substitute and scored the final goal in a 5–0 victory over Yemen.

In November 2022, Ghoddos was named in the final squad for the 2022 FIFA World Cup.

Style of play
Ghoddos plays as an attacking midfielder, striker or winger, and has been praised for his technical ability and clinical finishing.

Outside football

Personal life
Ghoddos was born and raised in Malmö and speaks English, Swedish, and Persian. His parents were born in Iran and hail from the city of Ahvaz.

Sponsorship
He has a contract with American sportswear supplier Nike and wears the Mercurial Vapor line.

Name
Ghoddos was born in Malmö as Saman Ghoddos. Upon switching allegiance to Iran in 2017, he was given the name Seyed Saman Ghoddoos in Iran.

Career statistics

Club

International
.
Appearances and goals by national team and year

1.Including friendly match against the Ivory Coast that Swedish Football Association counts but is not officially recognized by FIFA.
International goals
Scores and results list Sweden's and Iran's goal tally first.

Honours
Östersunds FK
Svenska Cupen: 2016–17

Brentford
EFL Championship play-offs: 2021

Individual
Allsvenskan Striker of the Year: 2017
Allsvenskan Player of the Month: July 2018

Notelist

References

External links

Profile at the Brentford F.C. website

1993 births
Living people
Sportspeople of Iranian descent
Footballers from Malmö
Association football midfielders
Swedish footballers
Sweden international footballers
Swedish people of Iranian descent
People with acquired Iranian citizenship
Iranian footballers
Dual internationalists (football)
Iran international footballers
IF Limhamn Bunkeflo (men) players
Trelleborgs FF players
Syrianska FC players
Östersunds FK players
Amiens SC players
Ettan Fotboll players
Superettan players
Allsvenskan players
Ligue 1 players
Ligue 2 players
Premier League players
2018 FIFA World Cup players
Expatriate footballers in France
2019 AFC Asian Cup players
Iranian expatriate sportspeople in France
Brentford F.C. players
English Football League players
Iranian expatriate sportspeople in England
2022 FIFA World Cup players